Liparoo is a locality in Victoria, Australia, located approximately 62 km from Ouyen, Victoria.

Liparoo Post Office opened on 16 February 1927 and closed in 1946.

References

Towns in Victoria (Australia)
Rural City of Swan Hill

Populated places on the Murray River